Colin West (born 13 November 1962) is an English former footballer. He played as a forward and scored 158 goals in 555 league and cup games in the English Football League, Conference and the Scottish Football League.

He began his career at Sunderland in 1981, playing more than 100 games for the Black Cats before moving on to Watford in March 1985. He was sold on to Rangers the following year for £180,000, though made only occasional appearances as Rangers won the Scottish Football League Premier Division title during the 1986–87 season. He returned to England with Sheffield Wednesday in September 1987 for a fee of £150,000. Two years later he signed with West Bromwich Albion, before he joined Swansea City in August 1992, following a loan spell at Port Vale. He moved on to Leyton Orient in July 1993 and spent five years at the club. In 1997, he was loaned out to Northampton Town, before he switched clubs to Conference club Rushden & Diamonds. The next year he signed with Northwich Victoria, before signing with Hartlepool United in 2000. After retiring in 2001, he spent the next ten years coaching at various clubs, including: Hartlepool United, Sheffield Wednesday, Stockport County, Millwall, Southend United, Notts County, Carlisle United and Northampton Town. He served both Hartlepool United and Millwall as caretaker-manager. He was most recently the assistant manager at Hartlepool United.

Playing career

Sunderland
West turned professional in July 1980, and made his debut for Sunderland on 17 October 1981 against Tottenham Hotspur in a 2–0 defeat at Roker Park under manager Alan Durban. The club narrowly avoided relegation out of the First Division in 1981–82 under new boss Alan Durban, finishing just one place and two points above relegated Leeds United. They then finished four places and three points above the drop in 1982–83. West was the club's top scorer in 1983–84 with nine goals. The next season, he scored three goals over the two legs in the League Cup semi-final win over Chelsea, but was left out of the Wembley final by manager Len Ashurst. Following this snub he joined league rivals Watford for £115,000 in March 1985. The "Black Cats" went on to lose their top-flight status in 1984–85, finishing two places and ten points short of safety. He scored 28 goals in 122 competitive appearances for Sunderland.

Watford, Rangers and Sheffield Wednesday
Following his arrival at Watford, West helped the club to a mid-table finish in the league. He was then the club's top scorer in 1985–86 with 16 goals. In total he hit 23 goals in 56 league and cup appearances for Graham Taylor's Watford. In May 1986, he became new Rangers' player-manager Graeme Souness's first signing when he moved to Scotland for a £175,000 fee.  However, a serious knee injury sustained in only his fourth game restricted his impact at Ibrox, but he did manage to play 12 games in the title winning 1986–87 campaign, scoring three goals. He returned to England to sign with First Division side Sheffield Wednesday for £150,000 in September 1987. The club finished eleventh in 1987–88 under Howard Wilkinson's stewardship, before heading into a relegation dogfight under Peter Eustace in 1988–89. West made 57 league and cup appearances at Wednesday, scoring 13 goals.

West Bromwich Albion
He signed with Second Division side West Bromwich Albion in exchange for Carlton Palmer in February 1989, but was unable to fire Brian Talbot's side into the play-offs in 1988–89, as they ended up two places and four points short of their target. The "Baggies" dropped to 20th in 1989–90, and were just two places and three points above relegated AFC Bournemouth. The 1990–91 season was a disaster, and West Brom were relegated into the Third Division for the first time in their history. Not highly rated at the Hawthorns, he made 73 league appearances, scoring 22 goals, during his stay in the West Midlands. He joined Second Division club Port Vale on loan in November 1991, making five appearances and scoring one goal for John Rudge's side.

Swansea City
He was signed by Swansea City manager Frank Burrows in August 1992, and scored two goals in his first start for the club in a 2–0 win over former side Port Vale. He went on to score 12 goals in 33 Second Division appearances, as the "Swans" reached the play-offs in 1992–93, only to be sent off for fouling Ian Hamilton during a 2–0 defeat by his former club West Bromwich Albion in the second leg of the semi-finals, which left Swansea with a 3–2 aggregate loss. West later said that "I instantly thought 'why on earth did I do that?' but the referee rightly sent me off. It was a very sad way for me to end my time with the club."

Leyton Orient
West switched to Second Division rivals Leyton Orient in July 1993, who were then by managed by his former boss Peter Eustace. The "O's" finished 18th in 1993–94, before being relegated in last place in 1994–95. The club struggled in the fourth tier, and posted a 21st-place finish in 1995–96 under Pat Holland, three positions above Torquay United, the English Football League's bottom club. He scored five goals in 26 appearances in 1996–97, as Orient moved up to 16th under Tommy Taylor's stewardship. In total he made 142 league appearances for Leyton Orient, scoring 42 goals. In September 1997, he joined Second Division side Northampton Town on loan, but made just two goalless appearances for Ian Atkins' "Cobblers". Two months later he was loaned out to Rushden & Diamonds of the Conference, in a move that reunited him with former manager Brian Talbot, and helped to fire the "Diamonds" to a fourth-place finish in 1997–98.

Later career
West signed with Rushden & Diamonds permanently for the 1998–99 season, and helped the club to another fourth-place finish. He moved on to Mark Gardiner's Conference strugglers Northwich Victoria in the 1999–2000 campaign, before ending his career at Hartlepool United, where he made just a single appearance in 1999–2000.

Style of play
West was a forward who was "powerful in the air and determined on the ground".

Coaching career
When West joined Hartlepool United in November 1999 he was appointed as assistant manager to Chris Turner. The pair helped the club avoid falling into the Conference when they arrived, before they led the club to three successive Third Division play-offs, though they never made it past the semi-finals. When Turner left the club to take over as manager of Sheffield Wednesday in November 2002, West briefly took charge of the first team on a caretaker basis. After a win and a draw, West left to team up with Turner at Hillsborough, and later followed him to Stockport County, before the pair left Edgeley Park in December 2005.

He then spent time as reserve team coach at Millwall, being appointed assistant caretaker-manager to Richard Shaw after Willie Donachie was dismissed. He later took up the reserve team coaching position at Southend United in December 2008. Three months later, with Turner back in charge at "Pools" on a caretaker basis, West left the position at Southend to return to Hartlepool as assistant coach. He left Hartlepool again in June 2010 after the club chose not to renew his contract. In February 2012, Notts County manager Keith Curle recruited West to work as a coach. He left the club a year later, when Curle was sacked. He was appointed assistant manager at Carlisle United when Curle took charge of the club in September 2014. The pair left Brunton Park at the end of the 2017–18 season. On 1 October 2018, Curle was appointed as Northampton Town, and again hired West as his assistant. The pair were sacked on 10 February 2021. 

In July 2021, he re-united with Curle after being named assistant head coach at Oldham Athletic.  Curle and West both left Oldham on 24 November 2021 with the club sitting in 22nd-position in League Two. West rejoined Hartlepool United as assistant manager on 18 September 2022, once again alongside Keith Curle, who was appointed interim manager on the same day. On 22 February 2023, Curle and West were sacked.

Career statistics

Playing statistics
Source:

Managerial statistics

Honours
Rangers
Scottish Football League Premier Division: 1986–87

References

1962 births
Living people
Sportspeople from Wallsend
Footballers from Tyne and Wear
English footballers
Association football forwards
Sunderland A.F.C. players
Watford F.C. players
Rangers F.C. players
Sheffield Wednesday F.C. players
West Bromwich Albion F.C. players
Port Vale F.C. players
Swansea City A.F.C. players
Leyton Orient F.C. players
Northampton Town F.C. players
Rushden & Diamonds F.C. players
Northwich Victoria F.C. players
Hartlepool United F.C. players
English Football League players
Scottish Football League players
National League (English football) players
English football managers
Association football coaches
Hartlepool United F.C. non-playing staff
Sheffield Wednesday F.C. non-playing staff
Stockport County F.C. non-playing staff
Millwall F.C. non-playing staff
Southend United F.C. non-playing staff
Notts County F.C. non-playing staff
Carlisle United F.C. non-playing staff
Northampton Town F.C. non-playing staff
Oldham Athletic A.F.C. non-playing staff